William Robert Roy (February 23, 1926 – May 26, 2014), also known as Bill Roy, was a United States representative from Kansas, a physician, and a columnist for The Topeka Capital-Journal. He was the Democratic nominee for U.S Senator of Kansas in the 1974 and 1978  senate elections, but lost both races.

Early life and career
Roy was born in Bloomington, Illinois, and attended the public schools in nearby Lexington and earned a B.S. from Illinois Wesleyan University in 1945, followed by a B.M. from Northwestern University Medical School in Chicago in 1948. He received an M.D. from Northwestern in 1949 as well as a J.D. from Washburn University Law School in Topeka, Kansas, in 1970.  He did his obstetrics and gynecology residency at Detroit Receiving Hospital.  Roy served in the United States Air Force from 1953 to 1955, and was a military doctor at Forbes Air Force Base in Topeka; he was discharged with the rank of captain. He practiced medicine in Topeka from 1955 to 1970

Roy was elected as a Democrat to the Ninety-second and Ninety-third Congresses (January 3, 1971 –  January 3, 1975). He changed his registration in 1970 to run as a Democrat.

He did not run for reelection to the House in 1974, but instead ran for the United States Senate. In a bitter race, he lost to incumbent Senator Bob Dole only by a few thousand votes, which was the closest margin of Dole's congressional career. In a 1996 interview with PBS, he explained his decision to seek election to the Senate, saying, "I was far from an admirer of Bob Dole, I'll tell you that. He'd been around and he had been pretty much a hatchet man, both in Kansas, and as far as President Nixon was concerned. And so I saw it as a wonderful opportunity to take him out of politics, which I thought was very important at that time."  He ran for the U.S. Senate again in 1978 but lost to Nancy Kassebaum. He resumed the practice of medicine in Topeka until 1989. He sought a rematch with Kassebaum in 1990 and won the Democratic primary, but dropped out of the race, citing personal issues. His replacement was runner-up Dick Williams.

In addition to his political races, Roy served as a member of the Kansas Board of Regents. Since 1989, Roy was a regular columnist for The Topeka Capital-Journal.  His columns often reflected a liberal perspective, including support for abortion rights and opposition to the policies of President George W. Bush.  His 2001–2002 columns in The Topeka Metro News rallied sentiment to stop the sale of Kansas Blue Cross Blue Shield to Anthem of Indianapolis.

Roy died in Topeka on May 26, 2014 of congestive heart failure.

References

External links

 Bill Roy's columns (labeled as a "blog") on The Topeka Capital-Journal website

1926 births
2014 deaths
Writers from Bloomington, Illinois
American columnists
American gynecologists
American obstetricians
United States Air Force officers
Politicians from Topeka, Kansas
Physicians from Kansas
Illinois Wesleyan University alumni
Washburn University School of Law alumni
Feinberg School of Medicine alumni
Democratic Party members of the United States House of Representatives from Kansas
Writers from Topeka, Kansas
20th-century American politicians
People from McLean County, Illinois
Journalists from Illinois
Military personnel from Illinois
Members of the National Academy of Medicine
Kansas Board of Regents
Deaths from heart disease